Dagobert Dang (born 6 February 1958) is a former Cameroon international football forward.

Career
Born in Cameroon, Dang played club football for local sides Prévoyance de Yaoundé and Canon Yaoundé.

Dang represented Cameroon at the 1984 Summer Olympics in Boston. He also made several appearances for the senior Cameroon national football team, including one FIFA World Cup qualifying match, and played at the 1984 and 1986 African Cup of Nations finals.

Personal
Dang's son, Arnaud Seumen, is also a professional footballer.

References

External links
 
 
 
 

1958 births
Living people
Footballers from Yaoundé
Cameroonian footballers
Cameroon international footballers
Olympic footballers of Cameroon
Footballers at the 1984 Summer Olympics
1984 African Cup of Nations players
1986 African Cup of Nations players
Africa Cup of Nations-winning players
Canon Yaoundé players
Association football forwards